The following lists events that happened during 2003 in Chile.

Incumbents
President of Chile: Ricardo Lagos

Events 
MOP-Gate case

June
6 June – The Chile–United States Free Trade Agreement is signed.

Deaths
15 January – Eduardo Alquinta (born 1945)
21 April – Fernando Campos Harriet (born 1910)
15 July – Roberto Bolaño (born 1953)
19 July – Elena Caffarena (born 1903)
29 October – Jaime Castillo Velasco (born 1914)

References 

 
Years of the 21st century in Chile
Chile